= Thessaloniki Underwater Artery =

The Underwater Artery (Greek: Υποθαλάσσια Αρτηρία) in Thessaloniki, Greece, is a planned multilane stretch of expressway along the seafront of the city and underneath the seabed. Its purpose is to alleviate traffic problems within the city center. The project has been cancelled in 2009 due to various financing and political reasons.

== Background ==
Proposals for the construction of the Underwater Artery have received heated debate since at least the early 90s. Proponents suggest that the project will create a bypass for most of the east–west car traffic, which currently has to cross the congested city centre (given that Thessaloniki is especially linear as a city). Opponents cite the high construction cost, question the efficacy of such a solution and voice concerns about effects on the urban environment.

The contracts between the State and the contractor were signed on October 31, 2006. They were ratified by the Parliament on February 8, 2007.

The project has a budget of 472 million euro, of which 66.5 million are to be provided by public and the rest by private funding. The operation of tolls will be granted to the contractor for a period of 30 years; the toll fee has been set at 0.90 euro.

== Technical characteristics ==
The road is planned as a 6-lane expressway with a length of 6.5 kilometres, of which 4 kilometres will be in a tunnel. The roof of the tunnel will be at least one meter underneath the seabed. The western end will be at the port area and the eastern end will be close to the Makedonia Pallas hotel.

Upon the completion of the works, Leoforos Nikis (the seafront avenue), which currently receives heavy eastward traffic, is to be pedestrianised.
